Two-time defending champion John McEnroe defeated Björn Borg in a rematch of the previous year's final, 4–6, 6–2, 6–4, 6–3 to win the men's singles tennis title at the 1981 US Open. It was his third US Open singles title and fourth major singles title overall. The final would be the last major match of Borg's career, due to his later retirement from the sport.

Seeds
The seeded players are listed below. John McEnroe is the champion; others show the round in which they were eliminated.

Draw

Key
 Q = Qualifier
 WC = Wild card
 LL = Lucky loser
 r = Retired

Final eight

Section 1

Section 2

Section 3

Section 4

Section 5

Section 6

Section 7

Section 8

External links
 Association of Tennis Professionals (ATP) – 1981 US Open Men's Singles draw
1981 US Open – Men's draws and results at the International Tennis Federation

Men's singles
US Open (tennis) by year – Men's singles